Afanasi Petrovich Trishkin (born June 4, 1934, village Pesochnoye, Kaluga Oblast, RSFSR, USSR) is a Soviet and Russian film and theater actor. He is an Honored Artist of Russia (2003).

Biography 
Afanasi Trishkin was born on June 4, 1934, in Pesochnya (now Kirov, Kaluga Oblast, Russia). In 1959 he graduated from Bryansk State Technical University. In 1964 he began his artistic career at Krasnoyarsk Dramatic Theater. In 1973 he was invited to a minor role in the film Engineer Pronchatov by Igor Vasiliev. Later, Vasiliev invited Trishkin to the play Cinzano, based on the text of Lyudmila Petrushevskaya.

The performance began to be rehearsed at Sovremennik Theater, using a certain period of administrative and creative, semi-legal confusion, including: Oleg Dal, Valentin Nikulin, Afanasi Trishkin. However, soon the rehearsals were stopped by order of the director of the theater.
. Unable to find work in Moscow, Afanasi Trishkin moved to Kishinev, where he worked at the film actor and studied at the film studio Moldova-Film. Removed in dozens of paintings from these and other studies, mainly in adventure strips.

In 2003 he received the honorary title of Honored Artist of Russia.

In recent years, it is in the Near the House of Stanislavsky Theatre. He took part in the work Yesterday Came Suddenly. Winnie-the-Pooh, Or Good-bye, Beatles — acute social drama, which played the role of the elder Christopher Robin.

Filmography 
The Favorite (1976) as bandit
That Side Where the Wind (1978) as Ivan Sergeevich
 A Hunting Accident (1978) as doctor (uncredited)
Dangerous Friends (1979) as   professor
Broken Sky (1979) as Captain counterintelligence
The Brothers Rico (1980) as Rosenberg
December 20 (1981) as Razum
 Agony (1981) as Maklakov
 Snowdrops and Edelweiss (1982) as Weber 
  Anna Pavlova (1983) as Sergeyev
 La Caza del dragón  (1986) as episode 
Vagrant Bus (1990) as Ivan Ivanovich Daganovsky
 Presence (1993) as port worker
 Wolfhound (2006) as Varokh

References

External links
 
 Афиша

1934 births
Living people
People from Kirovsky District, Kaluga Oblast
Russian male stage actors
Soviet male stage actors
Russian male film actors
Soviet male film actors
Soviet male television actors
Honored Artists of the Russian Federation